In enzymology, a maltose epimerase is an enzyme that catalyzes the chemical reaction

alpha-maltose  beta-maltose

Hence, this enzyme has one substrate, alpha-maltose, and one product, beta-maltose.

This enzyme belongs to the family of isomerases, specifically those racemases and epimerases acting on carbohydrates and derivatives.  The systematic name of this enzyme class is maltose 1-epimerase.

References

 

EC 5.1.3
Enzymes of unknown structure